Sui Wo is one of the 41 constituencies in the Sha Tin District in Hong Kong.

The constituency returns one district councillor to the Sha Tin District Council, with an election every four years.

Sui Wo constituency is loosely based on Sui Wo Court, Chun Yeung Estate, Ville de Cascade, Greenwood Terrace and Fo Tan Village in Sha Tin with an estimated population of 12,870.

Councillors represented

Election results

2010s

2000s

1990s

References

Tai Wai
Constituencies of Hong Kong
Constituencies of Sha Tin District Council
1999 establishments in Hong Kong
Constituencies established in 1999